Ebenezer Godfried Nelson-Addy (born 13 September 1992) is an English footballer who plays for  side Bedford Town, where he plays as a midfielder.

Youth career
Nelson-Addy started his career at Aston Villa at the age of eight, ultimately being released in the summer of 2012 after twelve years. He was part of the Villa academy side that lost the 2010 FA Youth Cup final 3–2 on aggregate to Chelsea, playing 90 minutes at right midfield for both legs. He also played for Aston Villa Reserves as they won the FA Premier Reserve League South and finished runners-up in the League final.

Non-league
Nelson-Addy joined Conference North side Brackley Town in March 2013 following his release from Aston Villa at the end of the previous season. He only managed one senior appearance that season before moving to Worcester City in the same league where he established himself in the first team. Nelson-Addy then moved back to Brackley Town for the following season, becoming a first-team regular, before transferring to Hartlepool United in March 2015.

Hartlepool United
Nelson-Addy joined Hartlepool United in March 2015 and made his League Two debut as a substitute in a 3–0 loss to Luton Town on 18 April 2015.

Bedford Town
On 3 November 2019, Nelson-Addy joined Bedford Town from Cambridge City, on 3 August 2019, Ebby resigned for Bedford Town in preparation for the 2019–20 season.

Personal life
He is a Christian.

References

1992 births
Living people
Association football midfielders
Aston Villa F.C. players
Loughborough University F.C. players
Brackley Town F.C. players
Worcester City F.C. players
Hartlepool United F.C. players
Barton Rovers F.C. players
Hemel Hempstead Town F.C. players
Cambridge City F.C. players
Bedford Town F.C. players
National League (English football) players
English Football League players
English footballers
English Christians